Selenge Kimoto (born 15 August 1966) is cyclist from the Democratic Republic of the Congo. He competed in the individual road race at the 1992 Summer Olympics.

References

1966 births
Living people
Democratic Republic of the Congo male cyclists
Olympic cyclists of the Democratic Republic of the Congo
Cyclists at the 1992 Summer Olympics
Place of birth missing (living people)